Misliče is a small village above Artviže in the Municipality of Divača in the Littoral region of Slovenia.

References

External links

Misliče on Geopedia

Populated places in the Municipality of Divača